The Grup Instrumental de València (unofficial English title: Valencia Instrumental Group) is a Spanish contemporary music ensemble created in 1991. Subsidized by the Ministry of Culture and sponsored by the Generalitat Valenciana through the Valencian Music Institute (IVM), it is the permanent resident ensemble of the Ensems Festival and a regular in the Alicante Festival.

In 2005 it was awarded the Music National Prize for its work in investigating and recovering the 20th century's musical repertory, through its participation in the concerts offered in the Cervantes Institutes' cycle "The exile of the Spanish culture″.

Players

References

Musical groups established in 1991
Spanish orchestras
1991 establishments in Spain
Valencian culture